Nonthaburi Civic Center station is a Bangkok MRT station on the Purple Line. The station is located on the Rattanathibet road in Nonthaburi Province.

The station is above the Rattanathibet road not far from the Khae Rai intersection.  To the north, the station services commuters from the Mueang Nonthaburi District Office and the Makutromayasaran park.  To the south, it serves the Samakkee residential area, Boss Hotel, Provincial Police station, the National Disaster Warning Center Thaicom satellite station, and the Thaicom satellite station.  To the east, it provides access to the Esplanade shopping and cinema complex Rattanathibet Road branch, located in the Tesco Lotus hypermarket.

The station has four entrances from the street.

References

External links

Nonthaburi Civic Center Station

MRT (Bangkok) stations
Railway stations opened in 2016
2016 establishments in Thailand